Rolf Daniel Vikstøl (born 22 February 1989) is a Norwegian footballer who plays as a defender.

Career
After previously playing for the club Våg, he came to Start in 2007, and played occasional games for the first team in the 2008 season. On 9 March 2018, he signed a two-year deal with Viking. He left the club after the 2022 season.

Career statistics

Honours
 Viking
 1. divisjon: 2018
 Norwegian Football Cup: 2019

References

1989 births
Living people
Sportspeople from Kristiansand
Norwegian footballers
IK Start players
Viking FK players
Norwegian First Division players
Eliteserien players
Association football defenders
Norway youth international footballers